Ian Stuart Dunbavin (born 27 May 1980) is an English professional football coach and former player who played as a goalkeeper. He spent the majority of his career at then EFL League Two side Accrington Stanley, where he amassed 151 league appearances over an 8-year-period.

Dunbavin joined the Liverpool academy as a goalkeeping coach for the academy’s under-16 teams on a part-time basis in 2014, before becoming a full-time addition to the club’s academy in October 2016.

Career
Born in Huyton, Merseyside, Dunbavin attended Christ the King Catholic High School in Southport before being offered a two-year scholarship deal at Liverpool in June 1996. He went on to sign a professional two-year-deal in 1998 but ultimately went on to make no appearances for his boyhood club, leaving the club for Division Three side Shrewsbury Town on 17 January 2000 on a free transfer.

On 30 June 2004, Dunbavin left Shrewsbury following the expiration of his contract. Prior to the expiration of his contract, Dunbavin had spent time on trial in January with Scottish second-tier side Raith Rovers and Second Division club Wrexham, with no move to either club eventually materialising. In total, he made 101 appearances in all-competitions for Shrewsbury.

On 12 July 2004, Dunbavin joined now-defunct Conference National side Halifax Town, then-managed by Chris Wilder. He signed an additional-one-year contract with the club in April 2005 before being sent out on loan to fellow Conference outfit, and the now-defunct, Scarborough in November 2005.

Following his release from Halifax at the end of the 2005-06 season, Dunbavin joined newly-promoted Football League Two club Accrington Stanley on 1 July 2006.

In August 2009, Dunbavin received a suspended sentence, for his part in a brawl for which his friend Steven Gerrard had previously been arrested. He was also ordered to do 150 hours of unpaid work, and expressed "remorse and shame" for throwing two punches at the victim.

On 2 January 2014, Dunbavin was signed on a one-month emergency loan by fellow League Two side Chesterfield, managed by former Stanley manager Paul Cook. The move came after Dunbavin’s falling out with then-manager James Beattie, which resulted in him being dropped in favour of young loanee Marcus Bettinelli. He would end up remaining with Chesterfield until the end-of-the-season, with Chesterfield going on to be promoted back to League One at the first time of asking as well as finishing runners-up to Peterborough United in the Football League Trophy.

Following his return to Accrington at the end-of-the-season, Dunbavin had the final year of his contract terminated by mutual consent on 5 July 2014. He made 161 appearances in all-competitions during his 8-year-stay with the Lancashire club.

Despite receiving offers elsewhere following his departure from Stanley, and speculated interest from newly-promoted Chesterfield, the club which he had spent half-a-season on loan prior to his release, Accrington would go on to be Dunbavin’s last club as a player.

He returned to Liverpool's academy on a part-time basis in 2014, coaching the academy’s under-6 to under-16 teams before becoming a full-time coach at the club in October 2016.

Honours
FA Youth Cup: 1996

References

External links

1980 births
Living people
Liverpool F.C. players
Shrewsbury Town F.C. players
Halifax Town A.F.C. players
Scarborough F.C. players
Accrington Stanley F.C. players
Morecambe F.C. players
Chesterfield F.C. players
English footballers
Association football goalkeepers
English Football League players
People from Huyton
Liverpool F.C. non-playing staff